Mukhtar Magomedsharipovich Gusengadzhiyev (born May 20, 1964, Izberbash, Dagestan ASSR, USSR) is an actor of circus, film and television. Master of Yoga.

Biography

Gusengadzhiyev was born as a Dargin. He studied at the Izmailovo Circus Studio (1989), the Darginsky Theater Studio (1990-1991), the Roman Theater Studio Raffaello Sanzio (1999-2000), the Cirque du Soleil acting studio (Montreal, 2003).

His profession sent him to different corners of the planet, to different continents, instilling love for different cultures and religions. He lived in thirty countries of the world, where he studied different directions of acting and performed at the most prestigious stages. His great experience on stage brought him to the cinema. He is also engaged in drawing and music.

In 1996, he became the owner of the title most flexible man in Europe at the International Yoga Congress in the Canary Islands. In 1998, Hollywood Broadcasting Company FOX-11 signed a contract to showcase his body's capabilities to the whole world and record it in the Guinness Book of World Records as The World's Most Flexible Man. 

He performs on the stage of the famous ZUMANITY Theater of Cirque du Soleil in Las Vegas, appears on Los Angeles television, Black Belt and Kung Fu magazines.

He is a frequent guest of educational institutions of different levels and directions, where he is invited to hold seminars and meetings with students.

On April 2, 2018, Mukhtar was sentenced to 22 years of strict regime with compulsory treatment for pedophilia, the creation and storage of child pornography.

Filmography
 Paradise in the Shadow of Sabel (1992) as Prince Nutsal Khan
 Pistol with Muffler (1993) as crazy
 Cirque du Soleil: Solstrom (2003) as lonely prisoner
  Kulagin and Partners (2006) as Nikolay Abayev
  My Prechistenka (2007) as Jamshet
  Platon (2007) as Abdul
  Yeralash (2007) as Wushu fighters
 Tsar (2009) as episode
  Peter the Great: The Testament (2011) as Dowd
 Devil's Pass (2013) as  Monster
 The Last of the  Magikyans (2014) as  Hamlet

Awards and honors 
1991  Laureate of the All-Russian Variety and Circus Festival Yalta'91 
1993  Winner of the international festival of arts  Gran Premio'93  in Milan, Italy
1995 Winner of the European Yoga Congress  San Marino'95 
1998  Laureate of the international teleorum  Sochi-Lazurnaya'98 
1998  Recorded in the Guinness World Record Book  Los Angeles'98 
2002 The record holder of the Guinness Book of Russia  Divo'2002 
2003 The record holder of the  Book of Records of the CIS and Baltic Countries'2003
2004 The record holder of the Association of Russian Records  Lefty'2004 
2008 Russian Book of Records

References

External links
 Official website
  Мой Дагестан
 

1964 births
Living people
People from Izberbash
20th-century circus performers
Soviet male film actors
Russian male film actors
Russian male television actors
People convicted of child pornography offenses
Russian people of Dagestani descent
Russian yogis
21st-century circus performers